East Gillespie is a village in Macoupin County, Illinois, United States. As of the 2020 census, the village had a population of 269.

Geography
East Gillespie is located in southeastern Macoupin County at  (39.137337, −89.814663). It is bordered to the south by the city of Gillespie. Illinois Route 4 runs through the village, leading north  to Carlinville, the Macoupin county seat, and south  to Staunton. Illinois Route 16 runs through the southeast part of the village, leading northeast  to Litchfield and west through Gillespie  to Jerseyville.

Demographics

As of the census of 2000, there were 234 people, 91 households, and 65 families residing in the village. The racial makeup of the village was 98.72% White, 0.43% African American, 0.43% Pacific Islander, and 0.43% from two or more races. Hispanic or Latino of any race were 0.43% of the population.

There were 91 households, out of which 26.4% had children under the age of 18 living with them, 62.6% were married couples living together, 7.7% had a female householder with no husband present, and 27.5% were non-families. 23.1% of all households were made up of individuals, and 11.0% had someone living alone who was 65 years of age or older. The average household size was 2.57 and the average family size was 3.09.

In the village, the population was spread out, with 23.1% under the age of 18, 9.4% from 18 to 24, 22.6% from 25 to 44, 28.2% from 45 to 64, and 16.7% who were 65 years of age or older. The median age was 40 years. For every 100 females, there were 108.9 males. For every 100 females age 18 and over, there were 102.2 males.

The median income for a household in the village was $35,000, and the median income for a family was $36,500. Males had a median income of $31,875 versus $21,875 for females. The per capita income for the village was $20,628. About 3.2% of families and 5.3% of the population were below the poverty line, including 6.3% of those under the age of eighteen and 6.7% of those 65 or over.

References

Villages in Macoupin County, Illinois
Villages in Illinois